Empire Banner was a  cargo ship which was built by Bartram & Sons Ltd, Sunderland in 1942 for the Ministry of War Transport (MoWT). She was torpedoed by U-77 on 7 February 1943 and sunk later that day by enemy aircraft.

History
Empire Banner was built by Bartram & Sons Ltd, Sunderland as yard number 286. She was launched on 29 June 1942 and completed in September 1942. She was built for the MoWT and was operated under the management of W T Gould & Co Ltd, Cardiff.

Empire Banner was a member of a number of convoys during the Second World War.

MKS 3X

Convoy MKS 3X sailed from Bône, Algeria on 3 December 1942 and arrived at Liverpool on 19 December. Empire Banner joined the convoy at Algiers She was fitted with anti-torpedo nets although these were reported as being broken on departure from Algiers.

KMS 8G

Convoy KMS 8G which departed the Clyde on 21 January 1943. Empire Banner was carrying 3,800 tons of military supplies, including tanks and other transport. She had departed from Penarth and was destined for Bône. On 7 February 1943, she was torpedoed by U-77 at 02:00 hours. Empire Banner headed for Oran but at 06:00 she was finished off by an enemy aircraft.

Official number and code letters
Official Numbers were a forerunner to IMO Numbers.

Empire Banner had the UK Official Number 169083 and used the Code Letters BCXC.

References

1942 ships
Ships built on the River Wear
Empire ships
Ministry of War Transport ships
Steamships of the United Kingdom
World War II shipwrecks in the Mediterranean Sea
Merchant ships sunk by aircraft
Maritime incidents in February 1943
Ships sunk by German submarines in World War II